Jamel Ishmael Williams (born December 22, 1973) is a former American football safety in the National Football League (NFL) for the Washington Redskins.  He also played in the XFL for the Las Vegas Outlaws.  He played college football at the University of Nebraska and was drafted in the fifth round of the 1997 NFL Draft.

Early life
Williams was born in Gary, Indiana and attended Merrillville High School in Merrillville, Indiana.  While at Merrillville, he played high school football, basketball, and participated in track and field.  In football, Williams was a four-year letterman and helped lead Merrillville to a Class 5A regional title as he scored 45 touchdowns and rushed for 3,238 yards (5.7 per carry) in his high school career.

College career
Williams attended and played college football from 1994-1996 for the University of Nebraska Cornhuskers.  After sitting out during his freshman season, he helped Nebraska go undefeated in 1994 on their way to the National Title.  Williams again helped the Cornhuskers go undefeated in 1995, with Nebraska securing a spot in the national title game against the Florida Gators in the 1996 Fiesta Bowl.  During that game, Williams sacked Florida QB Danny Wuerffel for a safety early in the second quarter, part of a 29 point explosion by the Huskers. Nebraska went on to win 62-24, securing their second national title in a row.  Nebraska's record during William's three years was 36-2.

Professional career
Williams was drafted in the fifth round of the 1997 NFL Draft by the Washington Redskins, and played there from 1997 to 1999.  He then played in the XFL for the Las Vegas Outlaws in 2001.

References

External links
 

1973 births
Living people
Players of American football from Gary, Indiana
American football safeties
Nebraska Cornhuskers football players
Washington Redskins players
Las Vegas Outlaws (XFL) players